During the 2006–07 Dutch football season, FC Groningen competed in the Eredivisie.

First-team squad
Squad at end of season

Left club during season

References

FC Groningen
FC Groningen seasons